Alan Wills (born 3 August 1981 in Cumbria) is an athlete from the United Kingdom.  He competes in archery.

2008 Summer Olympics
Wills represented Great Britain at the 2008 Summer Olympics in the Archery at the 2008 Summer Olympics, competing in the men's individual and team archery. He finished his ranking round with a total of 661 points. This gave him the 21st seed for the final competition bracket. There he beat Mauro Nespoli 103–98 in the first round and went on to edge out another Italian, Marco Galiazzo, 110–109 in round two. His run was ended by Juan Carlos Stevens of Cuba in the last 16 as he was defeated 108–104.

Together with Simon Terry and Laurence Godfrey he also took part in the team event. With his 661 score from the ranking round combined with the 670 of Simon Terry and the 657 of Godfrey the British were in fifth position after the ranking round. In the first elimination round they faced the Chinese team and got eliminated with 214–210. The Chinese went on to win the bronze medal.

2012 Summer Olympics

At the 2012 Summer Olympics, Wills again competed in both the men's individual and team archery competitions.  In the individual, he was knocked out in the first round by Taylor Worth. The British team were knocked out by the Ukraine in the first round of the team event.

References

External links 
 
 
 

1981 births
Living people
British male archers
Olympic archers of Great Britain
Archers at the 2008 Summer Olympics
Archers at the 2012 Summer Olympics
World Games silver medalists
World Games bronze medalists
Competitors at the 2005 World Games
Competitors at the 2009 World Games
Competitors at the 2013 World Games
World Games medalists in archery